Daniel Turner (born 28 January 2002) is a professional Australian rules footballer playing for the Melbourne Football Club in the Australian Football League (AFL).

Statistics
Updated to the end of the 2022 season.

|-
| 2021 ||  || 42
| 0 || – || – || – || – || – || – || – || – || – || – || – || – || – || –
|-
| 2022 ||  || 42
| 1 || 0 || 0 || 3 || 2 || 5 || 2 || 2 || 0.0 || 0.0 || 3.0 || 2.0 || 5.0 || 2.0 || 2.0
|- class=sortbottom
! colspan=3 | Career
! 1 !! 0 !! 0 !! 3 !! 2 !! 5 !! 2 !! 2 !! 0.0 !! 0.0 !! 3.0 !! 2.0 !! 5.0 !! 2.0 !! 2.0
|}

Notes

References

External links

2002 births
Living people
Melbourne Football Club players